David der Tolhildan is a 2007 documentary film directed by Mano Khalil and produced in Switzerland.

Synopsis
David Rouiller, the son of Claude Rouiller  a university Professor and a former President of the Swiss Federal Supreme Court, gives up a comfortable lifestyle in Switzerland and commits his life to the ideals of the Kurdish movement. Is he an adventurer, a dreamer, an idealist, a hero? Is his commitment visionary or illusionary? The film, "David the Tolhildan" encourages viewers to confront their own outlook on oppression, respect, human dignity, freedom, and violence. It also provides an impressive, realistic and up-to-date view of the current situation of the Kurdish freedom movement.

References

External links
David der Tolhildan in the catalogue of Blinken Open Society Archives.
 

2007 films
Swiss documentary films
Kurdish-language films
2007 documentary films